Viktor Putyatin (12 September 1941 – 2 November 2021) was a Soviet fencer. He won silver medals in the team foil events at the 1968 and 1972 Summer Olympics.

Putyatin died in Kyiv on 2 November 2021, at the age of 80.

References

External links
 

1941 births
2021 deaths
Ukrainian male foil fencers
Soviet male foil fencers
Olympic fencers of the Soviet Union
Fencers at the 1968 Summer Olympics
Fencers at the 1972 Summer Olympics
Olympic silver medalists for the Soviet Union
Olympic medalists in fencing
Sportspeople from Kharkiv
Medalists at the 1968 Summer Olympics
Medalists at the 1972 Summer Olympics
Universiade medalists in fencing
Universiade silver medalists for the Soviet Union
Medalists at the 1965 Summer Universiade